Burr House or Burr Mansion may refer to:
Burr House (San Francisco, California) also known as Burr Mansion, designated as one of San Francisco's official landmarks, and listed on NRHP in San Francisco
Burr House (Dodge City, Kansas), listed on the NRHP in Ford County, Kansas
Carll S. Burr Mansion, Commack, New York, NRHP-listed
Carll Burr Jr. House, Commack, New York, NRHP-listed
Theodore Burr House, Oxford, New York, NRHP-listed
George Burr House, Lodi, Ohio, listed on the NRHP in Medina County, Ohio
Peterson–Burr House, Salina, Utah, listed on the NRHP in Sevier County, Utah
Peter Burr House, Shenandoah Junction, West Virginia, NRHP-listed

See also
Burr Block, Lincoln, Nebraska, listed on the NRHP in Lancaster County, Nebraska
Burr Cave, Walker, Washington, listed on the NRHP in Washington